Álex Anwandter Donoso (born March 24, 1983 in Santiago) is a Chilean singer-songwriter, musician, and film and music video director. He became popular as the vocalist for the band Teleradio Donoso (2005–2009). In 2010, he began work as a soloist. Anwandter has two nominations for the Latin Grammy for Best New Artist and Best Short Form Music Video.

Biography 

Anwandter's Chilean family history goes back to the German Carlos Anwandter, who emigrated to Chile in 1850 and became one of the leaders of the German colonization of Valdivia. Álex's father, Paul Anwandter, lived a large part of his life in Brazil before moving to Chile at the age of 26.

As a child, Anwandter took violin lessons.  He went to school at Santiago College, and later he began studying psychology at university, but abandoned it shortly thereafter. He was also temporarily a student at the Escuela Moderna de Música but didn't show much interest in music theory.

Anwandter identifies as queer, is a vegetarian, and resides in Los Angeles as of 2018.

Discography 

 Odisea  (2010)
 Rebeldes (2011)
 Álex & Daniel (with Gepe) (2013)
 Amiga (2016)
 Latinoamericana (2018)
 El Diablo en el Cuerpo (2023)

 With Teleradio Donoso
 Teleradio Donoso EP (2005)
 Gran Santiago (2007)
 Bailar y Llorar (2008)

Production discography 
 No soy uno (Fother Muckers, 2007)
 Bailar y Llorar (Teleradio Donoso, 2008)
 Odisea (2010)
 Rebeldes (2011)
 Éxito Mundial (Adrianigual, 2011)
 Álex & Daniel (with Gepe, 2013)
 Odio (Planeta No, 2015)
 Prenda (Francisco Victoria, 2018)
 Tu Historia (Julieta Venegas, 2022)

Videography 
 2007: Pitica – Teleradio Donoso
 2007: Gran Santiago – Teleradio Donoso
 2007: Eras mi persona favorita – Teleradio Donoso
 2007: Máquinas – Teleradio Donoso
 2007: Tres caras largas – Fother Muckers
 2008: Un día te vas – Teleradio Donoso
 2008: Amar en el campo – Teleradio Donoso
 2008: Bailar y llorar – Teleradio Donoso
 2009: Eramos todos felices – Teleradio Donoso
 2009: Cama de clavos – Teleradio Donoso
 2010: Cabros – Odisea
 2010: Casa latina – Odisea
 2012: Tatuaje – Álex Anwandter
 2012: ¿Cómo puedes vivir contigo mismo? – Álex Anwandter
 2013: Tormenta – Álex Anwandter
 2014: Rebeldes – Álex Anwandter
 2016: Siempre es viernes en mi corazón – Álex Anwandter
 2017: Cordillera – Álex Anwandter
 2018: Locura – Álex Anwandter

Director 
 2009: Éramos todos felices – Teleradio Donoso
 2009: Cama de clavos – Teleradio Donoso
 2010: Cabros – Odisea
 2010: Hasta la verdad – Javiera Mena
 2010: Casa Latina – Odisea
 2012: Tatuaje – Álex Anwandter
 2016: Siempre es viernes en mi corazón – Álex Anwandter
 2018: Locura – Álex Anwandter

Filmography 
 2016: Nunca vas a estar solo

Awards

Notes 

1983 births
Living people
People from Santiago
Chilean singer-songwriters
Chilean composers
Chilean male composers
Music video directors
Queer composers
Queer singers
Queer songwriters
LGBT people in Latin music
Chilean LGBT singers
Chilean LGBT songwriters